Spessart (A1442) is the second ship of the s of the German Navy. She was commissioned at Kiel, Germany on 5 September 1977.

Construction and career
Spessart was originally built for civilian service by Kröger of Rendsburg in 1974. On 5 September 1977 she was commissioned into the German Navy, based at Kiel, Germany.

On 29 March 2009, as she was taking part in Operation Atalanta, Spessart was attacked by a 7-man pirate boat. In addition to the regular 40-man civilian crew, Spessart carried a 12-man security detail which exchanged small arm fire with the pirates, and repelled the assault. The pirates were captured after a chase lasting a few hours.

Gallery

References 

1975 ships
Rhön-class tankers
Piracy in Somalia
Ships built in Rendsburg
Tankers of Germany